In horology, a complication is any feature of a timepiece beyond the display of hours, minutes and seconds. A timepiece indicating only hours, minutes and seconds is known as a simple movement. Common complications include date or day-of-the-week indicators, alarms, chronographs (stopwatches), and automatic winding mechanisms. Complications may be found in any clock, but they are most notable in mechanical watches where the small size makes them difficult to design and assemble. A typical date-display chronograph may have up to 250 parts, while a particularly complex watch may have a thousand or more parts. Watches with several complications are referred to as grandes complications.

Types

Timing (visible) 

 Chronograph, with a second hand that can be stopped and started to function as a stopwatch.
 Double chronograph or rattrapante, multiple second hands for split-second, lap timing or timing multiple events
 Flyback chronograph, allowing rapid reset of the chronograph as it is running
 Counter chronograph
 Independent second-hand chronograph
 Jumping second-hand chronograph
 Simple calendar
 Quickset date
 Retrograde indication (hands sweep through an arc of a circle instead of the full circle, usually 90°, they spring back to 0° when they reach the 90° point and start sweeping again)
 Dead second (the second hand moves once per second instead of once per oscillation as in common mechanical movements)
 Foudroyante (or "flying seconds" - a dedicated hand that completes a full rotation in one second indicating fractions of a second)
 24-hour watch (with an hour hand sweeping through 24 divisions rather than twelve)

Timing (hidden) 

 Self-winding, using the motion of the wrist and arm to recapture energy
 Power reserve or réserve de marche
 Tourbillon, a mechanical refinement to an escapement that mitigates the effects of gravity on the operation of a timepiece

Astronomical 

 Annual calendar
 Perpetual calendar
 Equation of time
 Time of sunset
 Time of sunrise
 Date of Easter
 Sign of the Zodiac
 Moon phases
 Mechanized star chart
 Astrolabe dial
 Planetarium dial
 Equation of time variation within the year
 Display of zone solar time (as opposed to standard time)
 Display of true local solar time
 Display of sidereal time
 Display of time zones (usually, a second hour hand displays the Coordinated Universal Time)

Striking 

 Alarm
 Passing strike (chiming watch)
 Minute repeater
 Five-minute repeater
 Half-quarter repeater
 Quarter repeater

Non-horological 

By some definitions, a display on a watch may be a complication even if it is unrelated to time-telling. Some horologists discount non-horological features (even those tangential to timekeeping such as winding limitations mechanisms or power reserves) as being true complications. Examples include:

 Thermometers
 Barometers
 Compasses
 Altimeters

Grand(e) complications 

A grand(e) complication is a watch with several complications, the most complex achievements of haute horlogerie, or fine watchmaking.  Although there is no official definition, one common criterion is that a watch contain at least one (visible) timing complication, one astronomical complication, and one striking complication.

Ultra-complicated watches are produced in strictly limited numbers, with some built as unique instruments. Some watchmaking companies known for making ultra-complicated watches are Breguet, Patek Philippe, and Vacheron Constantin. The initial ultra-complicated watches appeared due to watchmakers' ambitious attempts to unite a great number of functions in a case of a single timepiece. The mechanical clocks with a wide range of functions, including astronomical indications, suggested ideas to the developers of the first pocket watches. As a result, as early as in the 16th century, the horology world witnessed the appearance of numerous complicated and even ultra-complicated watches.

As of November 2018, the top four most complicated mechanical watches ever created are manufactured by Vacheron Constantin and Patek Philippe, respectively. In particular, the Patek Philippe Henry Graves Supercomplication currently holds the title of the second most expensive watch ever sold at auction, with a final price of US$24 million (23,237,000 CHF [Swiss francs]) sold in Geneva on November 11, 2014. Two Patek Philippe Calibre 89 also currently rank among the top 10 most expensive watches ever sold at auction, with final prices over 5 million US dollars.

 The Vacheron Constantin Reference 57260 is now widely regarded as the most complicated watch in the world. It is a mechanical pocket watch which features 57 complications, introduced by Vacheron Constantin in 2015. The company claims that it is the most complicated mechanical pocket watch ever created. The Reference 57260 took eight years to assemble, and has 2826 parts and 31 hands. It weighs , and spans .
 The Patek Philippe Calibre 89 has 33 complications, using a total of 1728 parts. It was released in 1989 to commemorate the 150th anniversary of the company. The complications include the date of Easter, sidereal time, and a 2800-star celestial chart.
 The Supercomplication delivered to Henry Graves, Jr. in 1933 has 24 complications. The watch was reportedly the culmination of a watch arms race between Graves and James Ward Packard. The Super-complication took three years to design and five to build, and sports a chart of the nighttime sky at Graves' home in New York. It remains the most complicated watch (920 parts) built without the assistance of computers.
 The Star Caliber 2000 has 21 complications. They include sunrise and sunset times and the lunar orbit, and it is capable of playing the melody of Westminster quarters (from Big Ben, the clock tower of the Houses of Parliament in London).

The Franck Muller Aeternitas Mega 4 is the world's most complicated wristwatch. It has 36 complications, 25 of them visible, 1483 components and 1000-year calendar.

The Hybris Mechanica Grande Sonnerie is the world's second most complicated wristwatch.  Powered by the Jaeger LeCoultre Calibre 182 movement, with 27 complications and over 1300 parts. The movement is housed in a 44mm by 15mm 18k white gold case.

Use in smartwatches
In smartwatches, complications are features other than time display, implemented in software.

References

External links
 

Timekeeping components
Watches